Nurabad (also Romanized as Nūrābād) is a village in Khvormiz Rural District, in the Central District of Mehriz County, Yazd Province, Iran. At the 2006 census, its population was 17, in 4 families.

References 

Populated places in Mehriz County